The Bloor/Gladstone Library is a branch of Toronto Public Library, located at 1101 Bloor Street West, Toronto, Ontario.

Services
Information and reference services
Access to full text databases
Community information
Internet access
Reader's advisory services
Programs for children, youth and adults
Delivery to homebound individuals
Interlibrary loan
Free downloadable audiobooks

Architecture

It was designed by Chapman and McGiffin Architects. Its construction started in 1912, ended in 1913 and the library opened for business on October 25, 1913. The original building was inspired by the classical architectural tradition and incorporates many elements of the Italian Renaissance architecture, such as round arches, supported by pilasters with extruding head stones on the façade; decorative pediments that echoed Ancient Greek Temples; ornamentation, which included  non-structural brackets on the interior, two fireplaces with sculpted angel faces on both sides of each fireplace, natural motifs, etc.; a slightly hipped roof with what seems like an entablature, created with the use of brick ornamentation and terra cotta veneer; the attempt to create a "perfect" square-shaped plan of the library with barrel-vaulted ceilings and a courtyard. The library has undergone two major renovations. The first was done in 1975-1976 by architects Howard V. Walker and Howard D. Chapman, which mainly affected the plan of the library since the facade remained virtually intact. The second renovation was from 2006 to 2009. The architects involved in this project were Rounthwaite, Dick and Hadley Architects inc, Shoalts and Zaback, and ERA. As a result of this renovation, the library now has a "glass box" addition, its main entrance has been lowered by approximately half a metre and some of the interior features, such as the staircase, have been altered for functional reasons.

References

External links 
 
 Toronto Public Library: Bloor-Gladstone branch

Library buildings completed in 1913
Beaux-Arts architecture in Canada
Public libraries in Toronto
1913 establishments in Ontario
Libraries established in 1913